The Chrysanthemum Aphid, (Macrosiphoniella sanborni), is an aphid in the superfamily Aphidoidea in the order Hemiptera. It is a true bug and sucks sap from plants.

Host plants
This species of aphid is only known to live on Chrysanthemum species.

References 

 https://www.itis.gov/servlet/SingleRpt/SingleRpt?search_topic=TSN&search_value=200626
 http://www.mehrparvar.aphidology.com/Madjdzadeh%20(2009)a.pdf
 http://bugguide.net/node/view/255811
 http://aphid.speciesfile.org/Common/basic/Taxa.aspx?TaxonNameID=1168156

Agricultural pest insects
Hemiptera of Asia
Insects described in 1908
Macrosiphini